Tina Bru (born 18 April 1986) is a Norwegian politician for the Conservative Party. From 2020 to 2021, she served as the Minister of Petroleum and Energy. She was elected to the Storting from Rogaland in 2013 and became a member of the Standing Committee on Energy and the Environment. She was reelected to the Storting for the period 2017–2021, and continued as a member of the Standing Committee on Energy and the Environment.

Political career

Parliament
Bru was elected to the Storting for Rogaland in the 2013 election and has been re-elected since.

On 13 September 2022, she announced that she had received a notification of a tax slap from the Norwegian Tax Administration. The Tax Administration believed that she didn't pay enough rent to her parents while she resided in Stavanger, and thus did not meet the so-called additional cost condition. Bru herself believed that she fulfilled this, and also pointed out that she asked for personal guidance from the Administration in 2020 in an attempt to make sure that things were right.

Minister of Petroleum and Energy
Bru was appointed Minister of Petroleum and Energy following the Progress Party's withdrawal from government in January 2020. There had been huge expectations for her appointment and it was well received in the petroleum and energy branch.

While attending the opening of and offshore wind facility in the Rogaland province, she was heckled by protesters and blocked from entering a meeting. To the press, she expressed discomfort about the situation. She took to Facebook to note what she had been called during the opening. The general secretary for Motvind Norge, Rune Haaland, expressed dismay at the way protesters had treated Bru. He stated that most protesters only use their free will of democracy to protest, while also pointing out that the protesters in Haugesund where not a part of his organisation.

After an article was published by Aftenbladet and E24 about what if petroleum were to disappear, Bru was questioned by the Socialist Left Party in July 2020, if the article reflected reality. Bru responded by saying that "the Petroleum Directorate's task is to spread facts and knowledge about Norwegian oil fields and our petroleum and gas resources".

In October 2020, Bru presented negative numbers to the Storting regarding the Martin Linge oil field. She expressed that the field needs to be completed and be ready for production.

In February 2021, following revelations that Equinor had hidden partners and owners in Angola in 2011, Bru was questioned by the Storting Control and Constitution Committee. She stated that she expects Equinor to put up to the highest standards and not to make the same mistake again.

On 26 March 2021, Bru revealed that she had tested positive for COVID-19, and reported that she was feeling relatively fine.

After revelations about personal attacks and ridicule against Green Party politician Lan Marie Berg, Bru took to Facebook defending Berg and stated she had had enough. In a further interview with NRK, Bru stated she felt it was "like she received both racism and hate for being a woman".

In July 2021, following criticism by Green Party politician Rasmus Hansson about Erna Solberg, Bru and the majority in the Storting to be directly responsible for the heatwave and fires in British Columbia, Canada, Bru rejected the criticism and called it "embarrassing". To Dagbladet, she said "these are known tones from the Green Party. Whenever a big natural disaster strikes somewhere in the world, they almost always try to hold us personally accountable. That falls within its own unreasonableness".

At the end of August, Bru alongside minister of finance Jan Tore Sanner, announced at a press conference a proposal to reorganise the petroleum tax. The proposal received mixed reception from the opposition, with the Socialist Left and Red Party praising the proposal, while the Progress Party, Centre Party, and Green Party criticised it, with the Greens notably calling it "a desperate attempt" right before the election. The Centre Party called it a stunt. Bru specified that the proposal was not a step to liquidate the petroleum energy.

Party politics
In February 2020, after being suggested as new deputy leader of the party, she was subsequently installed as second deputy leader, succeeding outgoing Bent Høie who was nominated to be county governor of Rogaland commencing in 2021. She was subsequently elected second deputy leader in September 2020 unopposed.

After the Solberg cabinet's defeat in the 2021 election, Bru was selected as the party's spokesperson for financial policy.

Early and personal life
Bru was born in Moss on 18 April 1986, a daughter of Sigve Bru and Sissel Skalstad Bru. She has a bachelor's degree in management, with further specialisation in change management.

Bru is married to Thomas André Samuelsen from Stavanger, and they have one son, Ellis. In August 2022, she revealed that she was expecting a second child come by new year 2023. On 31 October 2022, she announced that she would be going on leave from her positions, in addition to confirming that she was expecting a daughter in February 2023.

References 

Conservative Party (Norway) politicians
Members of the Storting
Rogaland politicians
1986 births
Living people
People from Moss, Norway
21st-century Norwegian politicians
Petroleum and energy ministers of Norway
Women government ministers of Norway
Women members of the Storting